Typhoon Damrey, known in the Philippines as Severe Tropical Storm Ramil, was a strong tropical cyclone that affected the Philippines and Vietnam during early November 2017. Damrey first originated as a tropical depression over the Philippine archipelago of Visayas on October 31. Emerging into the South China Sea a few days later, the system strengthened into the second deadliest and twenty-third named storm of the 2017 Pacific typhoon season. Rapidly intensifying, Damrey became the season's tenth typhoon on November 3, reaching its peak intensity as a Category 2 on the same day. Damrey made landfall over Khánh Hoà, Vietnam on November 4 and began to rapidly weaken, fully dissipating on November 5.

Strong winds, heavy rainfall and severe flooding in Central Vietnam caused by the typhoon killed 142 people and total damage reached over 22 trillion VND (US$1 billion). Damrey made landfall in central Vietnam as the region hosted the 2017 APEC Summit in Da Nang.

Meteorological history

On October 31, the Japan Meteorological Agency (JMA) began monitoring a weak tropical depression located approximately 349 km (217 mi) to the west of Cebu. Six hours later, the JMA began issuing advisories on the system after winds near its center had reached about 55 km/h (35 mph). By about 21:00 UTC of the same day, the PAGASA had classified the system as a tropical depression, assigning the local name Ramil. Around the same time, the Joint Typhoon Warning Center (JTWC) had issued a Tropical Cyclone Formation Alert on the system.

By November 1, the JTWC had classified Ramil as a tropical depression, giving the international designation of 28W, after convection around its low-level circulation center (LLCC) began to consolidate. Thereafter, on November 2, the JMA upgraded the system to a tropical storm, receiving the name Damrey after it left the Philippine Area of Responsibility, becoming the twenty-third named storm of the season. After the system entered a favorable environment for intensification, including continuous convective organization, the JTWC followed suit on upgrading it to a tropical storm. Satellite imagery later depicted deep convective banding wrapping its LLCC, which caused Damrey to further strengthen. By 18:00 UTC of the same day, Damrey had strengthened into a severe tropical storm on the JMA scale. Shortly thereafter, the structure of the storm had become more symmetric, with much deeper convection and an improved radial outflow. Vertical wind shear was also very low at around 5 knots, which was favorable for intensification.

The JMA upgraded Damrey to a typhoon early on November 3. Three hours later, the JTWC followed suit and classified it as a Category 1-equivalent typhoon, after animated satellite imagery depicted a "strengthening" system and a well-defined circular eye like feature. The JMA had already declared that Damrey reached its peak intensity with 10-minute sustained winds of 130 km/h (80 mph) and a minimum barometric pressure of 970 hPa. Six hours later, microwave images showed the eye becoming well-defined and an improved storm structure with a large centralized convective mass occluding to its center. By 21:00 UTC, the JTWC upgraded Damrey to a Category 2-equivalent typhoon, reaching its peak strength with 1-minute sustained winds of 165 km/h (105 mph). The JTWC issued their final advisory on the typhoon on 03:00 UTC on November 4, as it made landfall in Vạn Ninh District, Khánh Hòa Province, Vietnam. While over land, its convective structure began to deteriorate, and three hours later the JMA downgraded Damrey to a severe tropical storm, then to a tropical storm. The JMA issued their final advisory on 12:00 UTC on November 4. The agency continued to track the system as it fully dissipated on 00:00 UTC on November 5.

Preparations and impact

Philippines
On October 31, the PAGASA had raised a Tropical Cyclone Warning Signal #1, the lowest of five, to a few provinces, mostly over Western Visayas (Region VI) and the island of Palawan. PAGASA had also warned residents of risky sea travel over the areas raised by the signal warning, including northern and eastern seaboards of Luzon. Some domestic flights were canceled and trips to and from the Batangas Port were canceled during November 1. Estimated rainfall around the 200 km radius of the system was classified from moderate to occasionally heavy.

The National Disaster Risk Reduction and Management Council (NDRRMC) stated that 305 people had evacuated in the provinces of Camarines Norte, Camarines Sur and in Mindoro, while some 1,938 people were stranded in ports over in Palawan and Batangas. Eight domestic flights were canceled on November 2 while the PAGASA suspended work and classes that day. 14 landslides were recorded in the province of Camarines Sur, killing one person. Three students also died in Busuanga, Palawan after drowning in a river. One road and four bridges were also affected and not passable in the Cagayan Valley. On November 4, the total number of fatalities rose to 8. Torrential rains caused by the storm resulted in 2.5 ft of deep flooding, damaging agricultural crops. Agricultural damages were totaled to Php1.03 million (US$20,000) over in the city of Aurora Quezon on November 4.

Vietnam

By November 8, at least 106 people had been killed in Vietnam as a result of the typhoon, with 197 others injured and 25 missing. Widespread flooding was reported, with more than 116,000 homes having been destroyed or damaged. UNICEF estimated at least four million people had been directly impacted by the storm and were in need of support. The beach resort of Nha Trang was among the worst hit areas, 30,000 inhabitants and tourists had to be evacuated from the area.

Typhoon Damrey was referenced in the U.S. President Donald Trump's statement at APEC 2017. The Russian President Vladimir Putin gave US$5 million in relief funds due to the typhoon's severe damage in Vietnam.

See also

 Other tropical cyclones named Damrey
Weather of 2017
Tropical cyclones in 2017
 Typhoon Lola (1993)
 Typhoon Lingling (2001)
 Typhoon Mirinae (2009)
 Tropical Storm Podul (2013)
 Tropical Storm Usagi (2018)
 Typhoon Molave

References

External links

 JMA General Information of Typhoon Damrey (1723) from Digital Typhoon

 28W.DAMREY from the U.S. Naval Research Laboratory
 Severe Weather Bulletin at PAGASA

2017 Pacific typhoon season
Typhoons in Cambodia
Typhoons in the Philippines
Typhoons in Thailand
Typhoons in Vietnam
2017 in Cambodia
2017 disasters in the Philippines
2017 in Thailand
2017 disasters in Vietnam
November 2017 events in Asia
Damrey